Nicholas Kearns (born 1946) is a retired Irish judge who served as President of the High Court from 2009 to 2015 and a Judge of the High Court from 1998 to 2015.  He retired as President of the High Court on 19 December 2015.

Early career 
Kearns was born in 1946 and educated at St Mary's College, Dublin. He attended University College Dublin and subsequently attended the King's Inns. He also achieved a diploma in European law from UCD.

He was called to the bar in 1968, the Bar of England and Wales in 1981 and became a senior counsel in March 1982. His practice was primarily focused on personal injuries law.

Judicial career

High Court 
He came a judge of the High Court in 1998. At one stage, he was in charge of the competition law list. He co-founded the Association of European Competition Law Judges.

He was an ad hoc judge of the European Court of Human Rights, serving from 2000 until 2009.

He was the chairperson of the Referendum Commission convened for the 27th Amendment to the Constitution of Ireland in 2004.

He has presided over the Special Criminal Court, and the former Court of Criminal Appeal.

Supreme Court 
He was elevated to the Supreme Court of Ireland in 2004.

President of the High Court 
He became the President of the High Court in October 2009. He retired in 2015 ahead of the mandatory retirement date in order to spend more time with family.

Doherty v. Ireland
On 12 July 2010, the High Court granted leave to Sinn Féin Senator Pearse Doherty for a judicial review into why a by-election was not being held in Donegal South-West. The seat was vacant since June 2009, following the resignation of Fianna Fáil TD Pat "the Cope" Gallagher on his election to the European Parliament. On 2 November 2010, the High Court ruled that there was an unreasonable delay in holding the by-election. In his ruling, Kearns described the delay as unprecedented and that the delay amounted to a breach of Doherty's constitutional rights. He declared that Section 30 (2) of the Electoral Act 1992 should be construed as requiring that a writ for a by-election be moved within a reasonable time of the vacancy arising. He further stated,
 
However, Justice Kearns did not order the Government of Ireland to set a date for the by-election. The Government announced on 4 November 2010, that the by-election would be held on 25 November. They also stated that they would appeal to the Supreme Court. On 26 November 2010, Doherty won the by-election.

Post-judicial career 
Kearns was appointed by Mary Mitchell O'Connor in 2017 to become the chairperson of the Personal Injuries Commission. The purpose of the commission was to review claims process in Ireland.

He became the deputy chairperson of the National Maternity Hospital, Dublin in 2015 and is a trustee of the Gate Theatre.

Personal life 
He is married to Eleanor, with whom he has four sons.

References

Living people
1946 births
People educated at St Mary's College, Dublin
Alumni of University College Dublin
Presidents of the High Court (Ireland)
21st-century Irish judges
20th-century Irish lawyers
20th-century Irish judges
Chairpersons of the Referendum Commission
Alumni of King's Inns